Chicken fat is fat obtained (usually as a by-product) from chicken rendering and processing. Of the many animal-sourced substances, chicken fat is noted for being high in linoleic acid, an omega-6 fatty acid. Linoleic acid levels are between 17.9% and 22.8%. It is a common flavoring, additive or main component of chicken soup. It is often used in pet foods, and has been used in the production of biodiesel. One method of converting chicken fat into biodiesel is through a process called supercritical methanol treatment.

Culinary uses 
Most uses for chicken fat come after its rendering process. The rendering process can be done several ways but the most common is by putting it in a pan to melt. Rendered chicken fat is also referred to as schmaltz. Once rendered, it can be used similarly to oil or butter in a pan or it can be whipped for spreading.

Nutrition 
Chicken is a source of protein, and chicken fat is another important nutrient in chicken. Chicken skin is usually taken off and thrown away but, this fat is actually an unsaturated fat that can benefit you. Saturated fat, however, has a correlation to atherosclerosis and heart disease, which are some of the most harmful and prevalent health conditions in the United States. Generally, in order to maintain a well-balanced diet, people need to eat more unsaturated than saturated fats to maintain healthy amounts of cholesterol. High cholesterol has been correlated with atherosclerosis and heart disease. An article published in Lipids in Health and Disease looked at the levels of cholesterol, protein and saturated fats within chicken.  Chicken with and without skin was evaluated and it was found that the chicken with skin was higher in cholesterol and unsaturated fats. The chicken that contained no skin and had the breast meat with the natural amount of fat was high in protein and low in cholesterol. It can be determined then that chicken fat is essentially healthy in moderation and it does not needed to be avoided at all costs because it contains protein, unsaturated fats and is also low in cholesterol which can cause major health issues.

Biofuel 
Researchers have been looking into more sustainable ways to develop energy efficient biofuels. Biofuels range in uses from transportation to power generation. Chicken fat, or chicken waste, has been a center for advances in developing a better fuel that can replace fossil fuels. The process to extract biofuel from chicken fat has been done primarily two ways: transesterification and supercritical methanol treatment.

Transesterification uses alcohol to form esters and glycerol then uses a catalyst to yield a faster reaction. Supercritical methanol treatment does not require a catalyst and dissolves the waste body product with high temperatures and pressure.

Transesterification has been used with other animal body waste products, such as chicken skin, but its use of chicken fat yields more biofuel in the end product. Through the process, two separate layers form—one red and the other yellow, the red being the glycerol and the yellow being the biofuel.

Supercritical methanol treatment has similar results; however, it does not require the use of a catalyst to yield biodiesel. Rather than form two layers, it equalizes the glycerol as a vapor and the biodiesel as a liquid.

Chicken fat as a biofuel allows for researchers and engineers to prove the extent of organic material as a means to power machines, buildings, planes, trucks, etc. Organic matter as a means to develop biofuel—or feedstock—is accessible and affordable and requires less energy to develop. Biofuel provides a sustainable alternative to petroleum or oil, which often needs to be imported from other nations. Chicken fat can be used as the base foundation for creating biofuel that is easily accessible and does not require international transportation. Biofuel does not result in toxic products like carbon dioxide and instead yields organic acids.

See also
Schmaltz, rendered fat that may be made from chicken fat

References

Animal fats